StarTimes Sports is a chain of pay-television  sports broadcasting channels operated by StarTimes in sub-Saharan Africa.

History 
StarTimes first foray into sports broadcasting was in 2012, when it purchased a package of Italian Serie A games to air one a week on its StarTimes KungFu channel. In 2013 StarTimes purchased a package to air one French Ligue 1 game everyweek also on its StarTimes KungFu channel.

On 19 July 2014, StarTimes Sports 2 was launched as the first channel in the StarTimes Sports channel chain. 
This was informed due to StarTimes taking in more sporting content as its satellite TV service expanded.
The new channel was to air football games from the UEFA Euro 2016 qualifying tournament, the French Ligue 1 and 2014 International Champions Cup.

On 1 June 2015, StarTimes added a third sports channel to the chain, StarTimes Sports Premium, this was after StarTimes Sports Focus was added earlier in the year.

Later on, in August 2015, StarTimes Sports Life and World Football were added to the StarTimes EPG bringing the total number of StarTimes Sports channels to five. 
StarTimes Sports 2 has since been rebranded to StarTimes Sports Arena.

StarTimes Sports channels also serve as a home for some football club tv channels in sub-Saharan africa, some of which include Barca TV, Roma TV, Chelsea TV, Arsenal TV, MUTV, Dortmund TV and Juventus TV. StarTimes Sports broadcasts a  variety of other sporting events apart from association football, ranging from tennis, cricket, rugby, badminton, table tennis, motorsport, boxing and volleyball.

List of channels 
 StarTimes Sports Focus (Sub Saharan Africa exp. South Africa) HD simulcast
 StarTimes Sports Arena (Sub Saharan Africa exp. South Africa) HD simulcast
 StarTimes Sports Life (Sub Saharan Africa exp. South Africa) HD simulcast
 StarTimes Sports Premium (Sub Saharan Africa exp. South Africa) HD simulcast
 StarTimes World Football (Sub Saharan Africa exp. South Africa) HD simulcast
 Sports 1 (South Africa only) HD simulcast
 Sports 2 (South Africa only) HD simulcast
 Sports 3 (South Africa only) HD simulcast

StarTimes Sports Focus 
StarTimes Sports Focus is a channel which broadcasts sports news, highlights and interviews. Its programming also includes, rugby and table tennis.
It also acts as a spill over channel for association football when necessary.

StarTimes Sports Arena 
StarTimes Sports Arena is the chain's home for fight events, airing events from promotions like ONE Championship, Bellator MMA, Cage Warriors, Glory (kickboxing) and World Boxing Council.
It is also used as a spill over channel for German Bundesliga and French Ligue 1.

StarTimes Sports Life 
StarTimes Sports Life airs the Chinese Super League and Liga MX. It also airs golf, volleyball and X Games. It has aired tennis and cricket in the past and also French Ligue 1.

StarTimes Sports Premium 
StarTimes Sports Premium airs a variety of sports, mainly from association football which include Bundesliga, Ligue 1, UEFA Europa League, UEFA Euro Qualifying tournaments and FIFA World Cup and its qualifiers. It has aired Italian Serie A in the past. 
The channel also airs Basketball events like FIBA World Cup and its qualifiers and the AfroBasket tournament.
Motorsport also airs on the channel, from events like Formula E and World Rally Championship.

Since 1st, September 2020, it has broadcast programmes exclusively in French. It acts as a French Language simulcast for most football events broadcast on World Football channel and it also serves as the home for the Spanish Laliga on Startimes

StarTimes World Football 
StarTimes World Football is a football only channel.
It is the home of the Bundesliga on StarTimes, but also airs Ligue 1, Serie A, FIFA World Cup, UEFA Nations League, FIFA World Cup qualifiers, International Champions Cup, FIFA World Club Cup, UEFA Europa League, FA Cup, Copa del Rey and Coppa Italia.

Sports 1, 2 & 3 
Sports 1, Sports 2 and Sports 3 are StarTimes Sports channels carried on StarTimes' South African subsidiary, StarSat.
They basically carry the same programming with the channels in the rest of Sub Saharan Africa, except for the UEFA Europa League and FIFA events which are held by rivals SuperSport in South Africa.

Sports coverage

Football (soccer) 
 FIFA World Cup 
 FIFA Women's World Cup
 FIFA Club World Cup (2015–2018) 
FIFA Beach Soccer World Cup
 Copa America
 UEFA European Championship
 UEFA Nations League (2020—present)
 European Qualifiers (Euro and World Cup Qualifying)
 UEFA Europa League  (2018–2021) 
African Cup Of Nations
African Nations Championship
CAF Champions League
CAF Confederations Cup
AFC Champions League
AFC Cup
AFC Asian Cup qualifiers
 Bundesliga  (2015–Present)
 DFL-Supercup  (2015–Present)
 Ligue 1  (2013–2019) 
 Coupe de la Ligue  (2018–2019)
 Emirates FA Cup  (2019–2021) 
 FA Community Shield (2019–2021)
 Serie A  (2015–2018) 
 Coppa Italia (2015–Present)
 Supercoppa Italiana (2015–Present)
 La Liga (2020–Present) 
 La Liga SmartBank (Promotion Play-Offs only)  
 Copa del Rey  (2020–present)
Supercopa de España
 Liga MX (2020—present)
 Chinese Super League  (2016–present)
 Saudi Professional League (2022-present)
 International Champions Cup  (2014–2019) 
 Ghana Premier League(2018—present) 
 Uganda Premier League
Zambia National Division One
Kenyan Premier League
Canadian Premier League (2020)

Basketball 
 FIBA Basketball World Cup
 FIBA Women's Basketball World Cup
 Afrobasket
 AfroBasket Women
 FIBA Under-17 Basketball World Cup
FIBA Basketball World Cup qualification(Africa Zone/ Involving African Teams)

Motorsport 
 Formula E 
 WRC
 Extreme E
Macau Grand Prix
British Superbike Championship
WTCR
ERC

Rugby 
 Premiership Rugby

Athletics 
World Athletics Relays
Valencia Marathon

Aquatics 
 FINA World Aquatics Championships

Tennis 
 Hopman Cup
 ATP Tour 250
 Davis Cup
 Fed Cup
 Diriyah Tennis Cup

Cricket 
 Bangladesh Premier League
 Pakistan Super League
European Cricket League

Boxing 
 World Series of Boxing
 WBC Boxing
 WBO Boxing
 Top Rank
 World Boxing Super Series

Volleyball 
FIVB Volleyball World League

Table tennis 
 Table Tennis World Cup
 ITTF World Tour
 World Table Tennis Championships

Badminton 
 BWF World Tour

Golf 
 PGA Tour Highlights
 LPGA of Korea Tour
 Solheim Cup

Kickboxing 
 Glory
Enfusion

Mixed Martial Arts 
 Bellator MMA
 Bare Knuckle Fighting Championship
 ONE Championship
 Cage Warriors
 Fight Nights Global

Wrestling 
 Major League Wrestling
 Lucha Libre AAA Worldwide
 TNA Greatest Matches
 World of Sport Wrestling
Impact Wrestling

Studio broadcasters/Presensters

See also 
 StarTimes
 StarSat

References

External links 
 

Television in Africa
Sports television networks